"Should I Do It" is the title of a song composed by Layng Martine Jr. which in 1981 was a minor C&W hit for Tanya Tucker, becoming a Top 40 hit in 1982 for the Pointer Sisters.

Overview
"Should I Do It" was recorded in the first months of 1981 by both Tanya Tucker and the Pointer Sisters for their respective mid-year album releases: Tucker's Should I Do It and the Pointers' Black & White. Although written by veteran C&W composer Layng Martine Jr. - who'd recall "Should I Do It" as an example of how "sometimes...a song just appears in my brain and kind of writes itself fast" - even as recorded by C&W superstar songstress Tucker "Should I Do It" was not considered a standard C&W number: Cashbox magazine described Tucker's version as a blend of "the girl group classic "[Please] Mr. Postman", with a honky tonk piano and a brief doo wop bit". As recorded by the Pointer Sisters the song was a more overt homage to the girl-group hit sound of the early 1960s.  A chart disappointment for Tucker in the summer of 1981 - stalling at #50 C&W - , "Should I Do It" as recorded by the Pointers would reach the Top 20 of the Billboard Hot 100 in early 1982 although it would not rank among the group's very biggest hits being a Top Ten shortfall.

Tanya Tucker version

Tanya Tucker recorded "Should I Do It" in the sessions for her twelfth studio album - which would be entitled Should I Do It - at the Hollywood Studio the Sound Labs in April 1981. Tucker was produced by Gary Klein, a veteran producer of several Pop & C&W acts including Tucker's swain Glen Campbell. 

The Tucker/ Campbell May-December romance was perennial tabloid press fodder, with reports, particularly from February 1981, attesting to the romance being a rocky one. Tucker's tabloid profile seemingly undermined her recording career: subsequent to a Top Ten C&W hit: "Can I See You Tonight", in February and March 1981, Tucker's two springtime single releases were both chart disappointments, with "Love Knows We Tried", stalling at #40 on the Billboard C&W chart where the Tucker/ Campbell duet: "Why Don't We Just Sleep on It Tonight", barely ranked at #85.

Charts

Released in June 1981 as the lead single from the album of the same name, "Should I Do It" would fail to reverse Tucker's chart fortunes: despite spending 7 weeks on the Record World Singles 101-150 chart rising as high as #131, "Should I Do It" would rise no higher than #45 on the magazine's Country Singles chart  - with a similar peak (#50) on the Hot Country Singles chart in Billboard - indicating a lack of support from C&W radio.

Pointer Sisters version

"Should I Do It" was one of two songs by Nashville-based composers to be recorded by the Pointer Sisters for their June 1981  Black & White album release, the other being the album's lead single: "Slow Hand" which had reached #2 on the Billboard Hot 100. Like "Slow Hand", "Should I Do It" was recorded by the Pointers with their regular producer Richard Perry so as to barely resemble a standard C&W song: in the case of "Should I Do It" the Pointers turned the song into (Ruth Pointer quote:) "an ode to the early '60s girl groups in the vein of the Shirelles and the Chiffons." The Pointers had in 1980 had a #3 hit with "He's So Shy" which had evoked the elements of the early '60s girl group classics while being a contemporary number: with "Should I Do It", June Pointer - the lead vocalist on "He's So Shy" - had sung lead on "a marvelous recreation - as opposed to modernization - of the late '50s/early '60s sound of the all-girl vocal groups."  

"Should I Do It" was mentioned as the choice for the second single from Black & White, and at the time of the album's release it was announced that videos would be prepped for both "Slow Hand" and "Should I Do It": however only "Slow Hand" was promoted via video, "Should I Do It" in fact appearing to be passed over for single release as two other tracks from Black and White: "What a Surprise" and "Sweet Lover Man", had single releases in respectively October and November 1981 with neither becoming a significant hit. However in December 1981 "Should I Do It" became an unprecedented fourth single release off a Pointer Sisters album to rise a #13 peak on the Billboard Hot 100 dated 3 April 1982, with Black & White therefore becoming the first Pointer Sisters album to generate two Top 40 hits. Passed over by R&B radio, "Should I Do It" reached #19 on the Billboard Adult Contemporary chart.

Outside of the U.S. and Canada, "Should I Do It" was released in November 1981 as the immediate follow-up single to "Slow Hand" with the single reaching the Top 20 in Australia, Flemish Belgium and the Netherlands prior to its January 1982 Billboard Hot 100 debut. Not one of the Pointers' most successful global hits, "Should I Do It" had its greatest chart impact in Belgium's Flemish Region and the Netherlands with respective peaks of #6 and #12, topping the chart peak in those territories for "Slow Hand" (#22 Belgium/ #33 Netherlands).

The Pointer Sisters would record another Layng Martine Jr. composition: "I Want to Do It With You", to serve as B-side of their followup single to "Should I Do It": "American Music". (Never featured on a Pointer Sisters' album, "I Want to Do It With You" - as "I Wanna Do It With You" - would become a Top Ten UK hit for Barry Manilow in 1983).

References

The Pointer Sisters songs
Tanya Tucker songs
1981 singles
MCA Records singles
Planet Records singles
Songs written by Layng Martine Jr.
Song recordings produced by Gary Klein (producer)
Song recordings produced by Richard Perry
1981 songs